Nikoll Idromeno (15 August 186012 December 1939), better known as Kolë Idromeno, was an Albanian painter, sculptor, architect, photographer, cinematographer, composer and engineer during the Albanian Renaissance in the nineteenth century. He is widely regarded as a precursor of both realism and landscape art in Albania.

Kolë Idromeno was born in Shkodër, which was at that time part of the Ottoman Empire. At age 16, he moved to Venice for six months and began his studies at the Accademia di Belle Arti di Venezia. Subsequently, he travelled throughout Europe and moved back to Shkodër and worked essentially in a variety of artistic fields. In addition, he made himself strongly committed for the Independence of Albania whereby he was forced to emigrate to Ulcinj.
 
Among his important works are a series of paintings where he tried to depict the social aspects of everyday life, customs and religion exactly as it appears. He was also distinguished for its rich use of colours and decorative shades with certain ethnographic elements and landscapes depicting places in or near Shkodër.

As an architect, he drew the plans for around fifty buildings either private and public. He also designed several industrial facilities, banks, the Rozafa cinema and Kafja e Madhe café. The coffered ceiling of the St. Stephen's Cathedral, which is one of the largest cathedrals in the Balkans, was also a design by Kolë Idromeno.

Biography

Life 

Kolë Idromeno was of Cham origin and was born on 15 August 1860 in Shkodër. His father, Arsen Idromeno, was originally a Cham Albanian from Arta but resided most of his lifetime in Shkodër, where he worked as a building contractor and married the local resident Roza Saraçi. In his hometown Shkodër, Pjetër Marubi, a close friend of the family, gave Kolë lessons on photography and started at the age of eleven to paint his first paintings with watercolors. With the compulsion and support of Marubi, he moved to Venice and stayed for some months at the Accademia di Belle Arti di Venezia, the academy of fine arts. Afterwards, he worked in the studio of an Italian painter.

After his studies in Venice, he started to travel around Europe and decided to move back to his hometown in 1878. There, he engaged himself in a number of different activities, working as in the fields of architecture, sculpture, photography, painting, composing, scenic design and engineering.

Career

Work 

Kolë Idromeno is considered as the founder of Realism in the country and the most important painter of the Albanian Renaissance, which started in the 19th century. He is referred as Michelangelo of Albania. Idromeno established a very active photographic studio and was the first artist to show motion pictures in country in 1912. In addition, he had kept up a correspondence with the Lumière brothers in Paris. In 1923, Idromeno was the initiator of the first art exhibition in Shkodër and was represented in the first national art exhibition in Tirana in 1931.
 
Until 1896, Idromeno painted mainly paintings with religious themes. Afterwards, he painted probably the first Albanian secular and realistic pictures with illustrating historical events and everyday motifs such as festivals and costumes such as "Dasma Shkodrane". He followed to paint various landscapes, "Oborri i Shtëpisë Shkodrane", and became the first landscape painter of modern Albanian art. His most famous work is "Motra Tone""Our sister", which shows his sister. This artwork is sometimes referred to as Albanian Mona Lisa. His works were represented in international exhibitions for example in Budapest, Austria-Hungary (1900) and New York City, United States (1939).

One of his best work, not very popular, is the portrait Gjergj Kastriot Skënderbeu painted in 1889. Its owner it is uncertain and the painting has never been in public. As an architect, Idromeno has carved his name into many well-known objects in Shkodra. The list includes Kafja e Madhe, the St. Stephen's Cathedral, Church of Shirokë, first electrical station of the town, Radovan Building, the Prefecture Building, Mosque of Parrucë and most of the residences of villas along the main boulevard in the northern historical district of Shkodra.

See also 

 Albanian art 
 List of Albanian painters 
 Motra Tone

References 

1860 births
1939 deaths
Albanian sculptors
Albanian architects
Albanian photographers
Albanian landscape painters
People from Shkodër
19th-century Albanian painters
Albanian male painters
19th-century Albanian people
20th-century Albanian painters
20th-century Albanian sculptors
19th-century sculptors